Giuliana Ruggieri (born 27 December 1990) is an Italian field hockey player who competed in the 2015 Women's EuroHockey Nations Championship.

References

1990 births
Living people
Italian female field hockey players
Female field hockey forwards
Expatriate field hockey players
Italian expatriate sportspeople in Argentina